Galston High School is a government-funded co-educational comprehensive secondary day school, located in Galston, a suburb in the Hills District of Sydney, New South Wales, Australia.

History
The school site was previously owned by James David Waddell. A cottage was built in 1867, now known as Waddell Cottage. Waddell lived in the cottage until 1969, by when the house and orchard were in a bad state of repair. Waddell had refused to put in running water or have the electricity connected. Because he hadn't paid his taxes, the land was resumed by the government as it was thought to be an ideal location for a high school.

Galston High School officially began in 1972, although the first classes were taught at Baulkham Hills High School. In 1974, the school's buildings opened on the current site and were added to until its final completion in 1982. The first HSC class to graduate was in 1977.

In the early hours of 19 May 2014, Galston High School's library caught fire. This occurred from some technical difficulties in the electric wire systems.

Notable alumni

 Adam Berry, footballer
 Aden Young, actor

Notable staff
 Elena Duggan, winner of MasterChef Australia 2016

See also 

 List of government schools in New South Wales
 Education in Australia

References

External links 
 
 New South Wales Department of Education – Galston High School

Hornsby Shire
Public high schools in Sydney
Educational institutions established in 1972
1972 establishments in Australia